Carmeleno may refer to:
 Carmeleno people, or Rumsen, an ethnic group of California
 Carmeleno language, or Rumsen, a language of California

See also 
 Camaleño, a municipality in Spain
 Camerlengo, an Italian title
 Carmel (disambiguation)

Language and nationality disambiguation pages